This was the first ever Commonwealth tournament held, and Anastasia Rodionova and Paul Hanley of Australia were the top seed. However they lost the final to Jocelyn Rae and Colin Fleming of Scotland 7-6, 6-7, 6-2.

Medalists

Seeds

Main draw

Finals

Top half

Bottom half

References

Tennis at the 2010 Commonwealth Games